Here Comes the Zoo is the fourth studio album by American rock band Local H, released on March 5, 2002 through Palm Pictures. This was their first album not released on Island Records. Starting with this album, every release so far has been on a different label.

The album was originally released with a lenticular cover, with two images of Scott Lucas and Brian St. Clair. Later printings were not lenticular, and only included the image of Lucas on the cover.

The album was originally to be released in late 2001 but it got delayed to 2002 due to the effects of the 9/11 attacks. 

On September 12th, 2022, the album was reissued as a 2-CD set for purchase on the band's website. The first disc features the original 10 tracks, while the second is a compilation of rough mixes from Here Comes the Zoo recording sessions. These rough mixes include the original 10 album tracks plus four others: three B-sides (Static Age, 25 Or 6 To 4, Stick To What You Know) and one track that was later featured on the No Fun EP in 2003 (Cooler Heads).

Track listing

20th anniversary bonus disc

Personnel
Scott Lucas – Guitar, Songwriter, Vocals
Brian St. Clair – Songwriter, Drums, Vocals
Simantha Sernaker – Performer on "Hands on the Bible"
Wes Kidd – Performer on "Half-life" and "(Baby Wants to) Tame Me"
Maxton Koc – Performer on "5th Ave. Crazy", "Rock & Roll Professionals" and "Keep Your Girlfriend"
Shanna Kiel – Performer on "5th Ave. Crazy"
Josh Homme – Performer on "Rock & Roll Professionals" - credited as J.Ho
Jerry Only – Performer on "Keep Your Girlfriend"
Gabe Rodriguez – Performer on "Keep Your Girlfriend"
Michael Alago – A&R
Nick DiDia – Mixing
Jack Douglas – Producer
Andy Gerber – Demo Engineer
John Hanti – Assistant
Areos Ledesma – Demo Engineer
George Marino – Mastering
Jay Messina – Engineer
Ryan Williams – Mixing Engineer
Tony Wright Cover art

Chart positions

References 

2002 albums
Local H albums
albums produced by Jack Douglas (record producer)
Palm Pictures albums